Theodore V. "Ted" Wells, Jr. (born April 28, 1950) is an American lawyer who works in the field of criminal law. A litigation partner at the New York law firm of Paul, Weiss, Rifkind, Wharton & Garrison LLP, Wells has been selected by the National Law Journal as one of America's best white-collar defense attorneys on numerous occasions.  Wells received his B.A. from College of the Holy Cross, his M.B.A. from Harvard Business School, and his J.D. from Harvard Law School. He and his wife, former Secretary of State of New Jersey Nina Mitchell Wells, reside in Livingston, New Jersey.

Wells attended Holy Cross at the same time as Clarence Thomas, now a Supreme Court justice. Both participated in a walkout based on their beliefs of unfair racially motivated practices on the part of the college. The two were part of the same organization for African-American students at Holy Cross.

In 2019 Wells represented ExxonMobil in People of the State of New York v. Exxon Mobil Corp., a suit alleging that the company misled the company's investors about management of risks posed by climate change.

Wells represented Lewis "Scooter" Libby, Jr., who was convicted on March 6, 2007, in the CIA leak grand jury investigation for perjury, obstruction of justice, and lying to the FBI.  Wells filed an appeal of Libby's convictions, but dropped the appeal in December 2007 after President Bush commuted Libby's 30-month prison sentence.

Some of Wells' more notable clients include Michael Espy, Senator Robert Torricelli, and Congressman Floyd Flake.  He represented former New York Governor Eliot Spitzer against allegations stemming from his alleged involvement in a prostitution ring.

In 2008 Wells won a $364.2 million verdict for Citigroup in a trial against Parmalat.  Parmalat had been asking for $2 billion in damages.  The jury found that Citi was not liable, and gave Citi the highest verdict award permissible.

Wells also has represented several major corporations during class action lawsuits including Merck, Philip Morris, and Johnson and Johnson.

In November 2013, the National Football League hired Wells to prepare a report on a bullying incident with the Miami Dolphins involving Richie Incognito. The report, released on February 14, 2014, made headlines for its finding of "a pattern of harassment".

Wells also served as the national Treasurer to Democrat Bill Bradley's presidential campaign.

In 2015, Ted Wells was again hired by the NFL, this time to investigate the New England Patriots' alleged "Deflategate" infractions. His report concluded that it was "more probable than not" that Tom Brady was "generally aware" of tampering with NFL game footballs during the 2015 AFC Championship Game. Ted Wells's independence and impartiality has been called into question in the wake of the report because of his extensive prior business relations with the NFL, his use of a scientific consultancy with a reputation for questionable client-serving results, and because of his track-record of success exculpating high-profile clients and corporations during public scandals. Eventually, Judge Richard Berman overturned Tom Brady's suspension in the Deflategate saga that had been based on Wells's report; however the Second Circuit Court of Appeals reinstated it in 2016.

Notes

References
"Profiles in Power: The 100 Most Influential Lawyers in America", National Law Journal, June 19, 2006.
Linton Weeks, "Ted Wells, Center Of the Defense: Scooter Libby's Attorney Makes His Case for the Powerful", The Washington Post, February 21, 2007.
Eric Lichtblau, "A Libby Lawyer Long Used to the Legal Spotlight", The New York Times, November 5, 2005.
Alan Feuer and Benjamin Weiser, "For Spitzer, Lawyers Both Formidable and Familiar Prepare to Do Battle", The New York Times, March 14, 2008.
Michael Reardon, "THE PROFILE: Theodore V. Wells Jr. ’72", Holy Cross Magazine, Fall 2005; accessed April 9, 2008.
Kevin Bohn and Paul Courson, "Democrats to Bush: Don't pardon Libby", CNN.com, March 7, 2007; accessed April 9, 2008.
Ken Bensinger and Ralph Vartabedian, "Toyota Calls in Exponent Inc. as Hired Gun, "The Los Angeles Times", February 18, 2010; accessed May 14, 2015.
Lloyd Grove, "The Scandal Guru", The Daily Beast, March 11, 2010; accessed May 14, 2015.

External links
Paul, Weiss | Lawyers | Theodore V. Wells, Jr.
Paul, Weiss Homepage

1950 births
New Jersey lawyers
Harvard Law School alumni
Harvard Business School alumni
People from Livingston, New Jersey
Living people
Paul, Weiss, Rifkind, Wharton & Garrison people
College of the Holy Cross alumni
New Jersey Democrats